Diacheila arctica is a species of ground beetle in the family Carabidae. It is found in Europe and Northern Asia (excluding China) and North America.

Subspecies
These two subspecies belong to the species Diacheila arctica:
 Diacheila arctica amoena (Faldermann, 1835)
 Diacheila arctica arctica (Gyllenhal, 1810)

References

Further reading

External links

 

Elaphrinae
Articles created by Qbugbot
Beetles described in 1810